Furry crab is an imprecise term which could refer to any of the following taxa:

 Chinese mitten crab, also known as the Shanghai hairy crab
 Kiwa (crustacean), a genus of deep-sea squat lobsters

Animal common name disambiguation pages